The Noida Sector 15 is a metro station on the Blue Line of the Delhi Metro.

Station layout

Facilities 
List of available ATM at Noida Sector 15 metro station are HDFC Bank, Punjab National Bank.

Connections

See also 
List of Delhi Metro stations
Transport in Delhi
Delhi Metro Rail Corporation
Delhi Suburban Railway
List of rapid transit systems in India

References

External links 
 Delhi Metro Rail Corporation Ltd. (Official site)
 Delhi Metro Annual Reports
 
 UrbanRail.Net – descriptions of all metro systems in the world, each with a schematic map showing all stations.

Delhi Metro stations
Railway stations opened in 2009
Railway stations in Gautam Buddh Nagar district
Transport in Noida